Baldwin Cove is a former hamlet in the "St. Barbe District" of the Canadian province of Newfoundland and Labrador.

See also
List of ghost towns in Newfoundland and Labrador

Ghost towns in Newfoundland and Labrador